Ernest Morgan (1881 – 10 August 1954) was a Welsh architect and painter.

As the borough architect of Swansea, buildings he designed include:
Mayhill School
Swansea Technical College extension, c.1910 (the Technical College became the Mount Pleasant campus of Swansea Metropolitan University)
Swansea Central Police Station, 1912-13 
Townhill residential district, 1920– (Morgan oversaw the Garden City layout)

References

External links
Swansea Heritage: Ernest Morgan painting

1881 births
1951 deaths
20th-century Welsh architects
20th-century Welsh painters
20th-century Welsh male artists
Welsh male painters